Fort Lyon may refer to:

Fort Lyon, Colorado, a U.S. Army fort used until 1897
Fort Lyon National Cemetery
Fort Lyon, Colorado, an unincorporated town
Fort Lyon (Virginia), part of the defenses of Washington DC during the American Civil War
Fort Lyon (Maine), a coast defense fort active 1905-1946
Fort Lyon, former name of Fort Wingate, near Gallup, New Mexico
Camp Lyon (California), sometimes called Fort Lyon, established in 1862 and later abandoned